Volodymyr Horbovy (1898–1984) was a Ukrainian politician during World War II. As a member of the Organization of Ukrainian Nationalists (OUN), he was one of the main drivers of the Declaration of Ukrainian Independence in 1941.

Youth
Volodymyr Horbovy was born on January 30, 1898, in the city of Dolyna (then Austria-Hungary, currently the Ivano-Frankivsk Oblast).

During World War I, he served in the Austro-Hungarian army on the Italian front, where he lost an eye.

In 1918, he joined the Ukrainian Halych Army, and participated in the Winter Campaigns.

During the inter-war period, he studied law in Prague.

Political Activity
In 1920, Horbovy joined the Ukrainian Military Organization (UVO). He became the liaison between the regional and national commands in 1922. In 1929, he joined OUN.

In 1934, he was imprisoned by Polish authorities.

On June 22, 1941, the Ukrainian National Committee (Ukrayinsky Natsionalny' Komitet; UNK) was created in Kraków, with Volodymyr Horbovy as a president. The UNK published an essay, "Memorial", which outlined the plans of the OUN to declare independence.

References

1898 births
1984 deaths
People from Dolyna
People from the Kingdom of Galicia and Lodomeria
Ukrainian Austro-Hungarians
Austro-Hungarian military personnel of World War I
20th-century Ukrainian lawyers
Ukrainian politicians before 1991
Organization of Ukrainian Nationalists politicians
Ukrainian nationalists
Inmates of Bereza Kartuska Prison
Births in Dolyna